Christian Dudek (18 December 1965 – 7 September 2008), also known as Chris Witchhunter, was a long-time drummer for the German thrash metal band Sodom. He was kicked out of the band in 1992 but came back in 2007 to record The Final Sign of Evil, which featured the original line-up for the first time in 22 years. In 2008, he died of liver failure at the age of 42.

Discography

With Sodom 
In the Sign of Evil (1984)
Obsessed by Cruelty (1986)
Persecution Mania (1987)
A Mortal Way of Live (Live Album) (1988)
Agent Orange (1989)
Better Off Dead (1990)
Tapping the Vein (1992) 
The Final Sign of Evil (2007)

References 

Sodom (band) members
German heavy metal drummers
Male drummers
People from Gelsenkirchen
1965 births
2008 deaths
Deaths from liver failure
20th-century German musicians
20th-century German male musicians